In mathematics, a real structure on a complex vector space is a way to decompose the complex vector space in the direct sum of two real vector spaces.

Vector space

A real structure on a complex vector space V is an antilinear involution . A real structure defines a real subspace , its fixed locus, and the natural map

is an isomorphism. Conversely any vector space that is the complexification
of a real vector space has a natural real structure.

One first notes that every complex space V has a realification obtained by taking the same vectors as in the original set and restricting the scalars to be real.

Naturally, one would wish to represent V as the direct sum of two real vector spaces, the "real and imaginary parts of V". There is no canonical way of doing this: such a splitting is an additional real structure in V. It may be introduced as follows. Let  be an antilinear map such that , that is an antilinear involution of the complex space V. 
Any vector  can be written , 

Therefore, one gets a direct sum of vector spaces  where:

The linear map , where , is an isomorphism of real vector spaces, whence:

.

The second factor  is 
The direct sum  reads now as:

,

i.e. as the direct sum of the "real"  and "imaginary"  parts of V.  This construction strongly depends on the choice of an antilinear involution of the complex vector space V. The complexification of the real vector space , i.e., 
 admits 
a natural real structure and hence is canonically isomorphic to the direct sum of two copies of :

.

It follows a natural linear isomorphism  between complex vector spaces with a given real structure.

A real structure on a complex vector space V, that is an antilinear involution , may be equivalently described in terms of the linear map  from the vector space  to the complex conjugate vector space  defined by

.

Algebraic variety
For an algebraic variety defined over a subfield of the real numbers,
the real structure is the complex conjugation acting on the points of the variety in complex projective or affine space.
Its fixed locus is the space of real points of the variety (which may be empty).

Scheme
For a scheme defined over a subfield of the real numbers, complex conjugation
is in a natural way a member of the Galois group of the algebraic closure of the base field.
The real structure is the Galois action of this conjugation on the extension of the
scheme over the algebraic closure of the base field.
The real points are the points whose residue field is fixed (which may be empty).

Reality structure
In mathematics, a reality structure on a complex vector space V is a decomposition of V into two real subspaces, called the real and imaginary parts of V:

Here VR is a real subspace of V, i.e. a subspace of V considered as a vector space over the real numbers.  If V has complex dimension n (real dimension 2n), then VR must have real dimension n. 

The standard reality structure on the vector space  is the decomposition

In the presence of a reality structure, every vector in V has a real part and an imaginary part, each of which is a vector in VR:

In this case, the complex conjugate of a vector v is defined as follows:

This map  is an antilinear involution, i.e.

Conversely, given an antilinear involution  on a complex vector space V, it is possible to define a reality structure on V as follows.  Let

and define

Then

This is actually the decomposition of V as the eigenspaces of the real linear operator c.  The eigenvalues of c are +1 and −1, with eigenspaces VR and  VR, respectively.  Typically, the operator c itself, rather than the eigenspace decomposition it entails, is referred to as the reality structure on V.

See also 
Antilinear map
Canonical complex conjugation map
Complex conjugate
Complex conjugate vector space
Complexification
Linear complex structure
Linear map
Sesquilinear form
Spinor calculus

Notes

References
 Horn and Johnson, Matrix Analysis, Cambridge University Press, 1985. . (antilinear maps are discussed in section 4.6).
 Budinich, P. and Trautman, A. The Spinorial Chessboard. Springer-Verlag, 1988. . (antilinear maps are discussed in section 3.3).
 

Structures on manifolds